Givat Haviva International School (GHIS) offers the two-year International Baccalaureate Diploma Programme (IBDP) for 11th and 12th grade students, as well as a pre-IB preparatory year for 10th graders. As coeducational secondary boarding school located in Northern Israel, GHIS seeks to transform the Middle East and beyond by developing a network of global leaders who will work together to achieve a shared society and a sustainable, just future.

Jews and Arabs from Israel, as well as international students, live and learn together in a unique collaborative community that promotes the values of social justice, equality, interculturalism, and cooperation. Students learn to deal with different political and cultural issues, ideas, and opinions, coming to understand and overcome their differences by listening, respecting, and learning the power of authentic communication and kindness. The school currently serves 125 students representing more than 25 nationalities and is located on the campus of Givat Haviva, a peace-building organization that has received the UNESCO Peace Prize.

Administration 
The school's current head is Israeli educator and conductor Yuval Dvir. The executive director and co-founder is Nurit Gery

Events

Ministry of Foreign Affairs 
The student body was invited to attend a meeting with Yuval Rotem, the Director General of the Israeli Ministry of Foreign Affairs and visited the ministry in Jerusalem on 23 January 2019.

Austrian state visit 
On 6 February 2019, Austrian president Alexander van der Bellen visited GHIS as part of a state visit to Israel. Van der Bellen was accompanied by a delegation of journalists and prominent Austrians including his military attaché  and Martin Weiss, the Austrian ambassador to Israel.

References

External links
 Official website 

Boarding schools in Israel
International schools in Israel
High schools and secondary schools
International Baccalaureate schools

Israeli–Palestinian peace process
UNESCO Prize for Peace Education recipients

Educational institutions with year of establishment missing